Kristiansands Stiftsavis og Adressekontors-Efterretninger was a Norwegian newspaper, published in Kristiansand in Vest-Agder county.

Kristiansands Stiftsavis og Adressekontors-Efterretninger was started in 1790 as Christianssands Adresse-Contors Efterretninger. It stopped in 1838, but returned under a new name in 1839. It went defunct in 1896.

References

Publications established in 1790
Publications disestablished in 1896
Defunct newspapers published in Norway
Mass media in Kristiansand